The Battle of Komárom may refer to any of the following battles between Hungarian and Austrian forces:

 First Battle of Komárom (1849), on 26 April
 Second Battle of Komárom (1849), on 2 July
 Third Battle of Komárom (1849), on 11 July